The 1935 Wake Forest Demon Deacons football team was an American football team that represented Wake Forest University during the 1935 college football season. In its third season under head coach Jim Weaver, the team compiled a 2–7 record.

Schedule

References

Wake Forest
Wake Forest Demon Deacons football seasons
Wake Forest Demon Deacons football